Jeanne Itasse-Broquet (1867–1941) was a French sculptor. She began her career at the age of fourteen, exhibiting at the Paris Salon.

Biography
Itasse was born on 25 September 1867 in Paris. She received her training from her father, . She married fellow sculptor .

Itasse-Broquet began exhibiting her work at the Paris Salon around 1881 and continued to do so until 1938. She exhibited  her work at the Palace of Fine Arts and The Woman's Building at the 1893 World's Columbian Exposition in Chicago, Illinois. She also exhibited at the Exposition Universelle in 1900. She received medals at both exhibitions.

Itasse-Broquet died in 1941 in Paris.

References

External links
 

1867 births
1941 deaths
19th-century French sculptors
20th-century French sculptors
19th-century French women artists
Artists from Paris
20th-century French women artists
French women sculptors